Ameiridae is a family of crustaceans belonging to the order Harpacticoida.

Genera

Genera:
 Abnitocrella Karanovic, 2006
 Abscondicola Fiers, 1990
 Ameira Boeck, 1865

References

Harpacticoida
Crustacean families